Steve Fogen (born 28 September 1979 in Esch-sur-Alzette) is a Luxembourgish cyclist.

Palmares

1997
1st  Junior National Cyclo-cross Championships
1998
2nd National Cyclo-cross Championships
1999
2nd U23 National Cyclo-cross Championships
3rd National Time Trial Championships
2000
1st  National Time Trial Championships
1st  National Cyclo-cross Championships
2001
1st Chrono Champenois
1st Stages 3b & 4 Flèche du Sud
2nd Games of the Small States of Europe Time Trial
2nd U23 National Cyclo-cross Championships
3rd Games of the Small States of Europe Road race
2002
2nd National Time Trial Championships
3rd Overall Flèche du Sud
3rd National Road Race Championships

References

1979 births
Living people
Luxembourgian male cyclists
Sportspeople from Esch-sur-Alzette